Rajiv Memani (born 28 January 1968) is the Chairman & Regional Managing Partner of EY India, (formerly known as Ernst & Young). He is also a member of EY’s Global Executive Board and Chairman of EY’s Global Emerging Markets Committee.

Early life and education
Rajiv completed his schooling from the Delhi Public School (DPS) R K Puram in 1985. He subsequently received his Bachelor of Commerce (Hons) degree from the Shri Ram College of Commerce (SRCC), Delhi University, in 1988 and completed his chartered accountancy (CA) in 1991.

Career
Rajiv joined an India member-firm of EY Global in mid-1980s and completed his articleship over the next 3 years. 
He worked in the tax and assurance practices of an EY member firm in India and also with Corporate Finance practice at EY Singapore.  In the late 1990s, he established the Corporate Finance practice of EY in India. In 2004, Memani was appointed the CEO and Regional Managing Partner of EY in India.
 
In 2013, Rajiv was appointed on the Global Executive Board of EY as the Chairman of the Global Emerging Markets Committee, in addition to his role as the Chairman & Regional Managing Partner, EY India. In his role as the Chairman of Global Emerging Markets committee, Rajiv's responsibilities include connecting emerging markets with developed markets as well as recommending investment plans for these markets.

Memberships and achievements
Rajiv is currently affiliated with prominent business and industry associations. He is a member of the National Council of the Confederation of Indian Industry (CII), in addition to being the Chairman of its National Committee on Tax. He is also the past President of the India Chapter of the International Chamber of Commerce (ICC).
 
Rajiv has been a part of several policy advisory committees constituted by Government of India. Most recently, he was appointed by the Ministry of Finance, GoI, as part of a taskforce to draft a new Direct Tax legislation that submitted its report in 2019. In the past, he has been a part of the Ministry of Finance Committee to simplify the provisions of the Income Tax Act, and the Ministry of Railways Advisory Body to modify the accounting system for tracking expenditure to desired outcomes.

References

External links
 Rajiv Memani corporate biography

1968 births
Living people
Ernst & Young people
Indian accountants
Delhi University alumni